Felicia Dawn Spencer (born November 20, 1990) is a retired Canadian mixed martial artist. She is the former Invicta FC Featherweight champion and formally competed in the Featherweight division of the Ultimate Fighting Championship.

Background
Spencer was born in Montreal, Quebec, and she moved to Englewood, Florida with her family as a child, where she later graduated from Lemon Bay High School. Joining her older brothers, Spencer started training in Taekwondo at the age of four. At twelve years old, she started training in Brazilian jiu-jitsu and added kickboxing to her training five years later. She transitioned to train in MMA when she joined Jungle MMA in 2009, when she moved to Orlando to attend the University of Central Florida.

Mixed martial arts career

Early career
Spencer started her amateur career in 2012. After winning the first "Tuff-N-Uff Future Stars of MMA" tournament where she submitted Leanne Foster and knocked out Jessica Eve Richer at the second "Tuff-N-Uff Xtreme", amassing a record of 5–1,  Invicta FC signed her in 2015.

Invicta Fighting Championships
Spencer made her promotional debut on September 12, 2015 at Invicta FC 14: Evinger vs. Kianzad against Rachel Wiley. She won the fight via a technical knock out in round one.

Her next fight came over eighteen months later on March 25, 2017 at Invicta FC 22: Evinger vs. Kunitskaya 2. She faced Madison McElhaney in a Featherweight bout and she won the fight via unanimous decision with the scoreboard of (30–27, 30–27, and 29–28).

On July 15, 2017 Spencer faced Amy Coleman at Invicta FC 24: Dudieva vs. Borella. She won the fight via a rear-naked choke in round one. The submission earned her the Performance of the Night bonus.

Spencer faced Akeel Al-Hameed on January 13, 2018 at Invicta FC 27: Kaufman vs. Kianzad. She won the fight via unanimous decision (30–27, 30–27, and 30–27). The bout earned both fighters the Fight of the Night bonus.

Spencer faced Helena Kolesnyk on July 21, 2018 at Invicta FC 30: Frey vs. Grusander. She won the fight via a rear-naked choke. The submission earned her the Performance of the Night bonus.

Spencer faced Pam Sorenson on November 16, 2018 at Invicta FC 32: Spencer vs. Sorenson for the vacant Invicta Featherweight title. She won the fight via a rear-naked choke in round four.

Ultimate Fighting Championship
Spencer signed with the UFC in March 2019 after compiling an undefeated record of 6–0 competing in Invicta FC.

Spencer made her promotional debut on May 18, 2019 at UFC Fight Night: dos Anjos vs. Lee against Megan Anderson. Spencer won the fight in the first round by rear naked choke.

Spencer faced Cris Cyborg in the co-main event on July 27, 2019 at UFC 240. She lost the fight via unanimous decision.

Spencer faced Zarah Fairn Dos Santos on February 29, 2020 at UFC Fight Night 169. She would go on to win the fight via TKO in the first round.

Spencer was expected to face current champion Amanda Nunes on May 9, 2020 at UFC 250. However, on April 9, Dana White, the president of UFC announced that this event was postponed and the bout eventually took place on June 6, 2020 at UFC 250. She lost the bout via unanimous decision.

Spencer was scheduled to face Danyelle Wolf on May 22, 2021 at UFC Fight Night 188. However, Wolf pulled out of the fight in early May due to an undisclosed injury and was replaced by Norma Dumont. Spencer lost the bout via split decision.

Spencer faced Leah Letson on November 13, 2021 at UFC Fight Night 197. She won the fight via technical knockout in round three.

On December 2, 2021, Spencer announced her retirement from professional MMA competition.

Personal life 
Spencer graduated at Lemon Bay High School before going on to earn a degree from University of Central Florida. She works as a sixth grade algebra teacher at Florida Virtual School.

Championships and accomplishments
Ultimate Fighting Championship
Most bouts in the UFC Women's Featherweight division history (six)
Tied (with Megan Anderson) for the most finishes in the UFC Women's Featherweight division history (three)
Tied (with Cris Cyborg and Megan Anderson) for the most knockout wins in the UFC Women's Featherweight division history (two)
Tied for the most submission wins in the UFC Women's Featherweight division history (one)

Invicta Fighting Championships
Invicta FC Featherweight Championship (one time; former)
Performance of the Night (two times) 
Fight of the Night (one time)

Mixed martial arts record

|-
|Win
|align=center|9–3
|Leah Letson
|TKO (punches)
|UFC Fight Night: Holloway vs. Rodríguez
|
|align=center|3
|align=center|4:25
|Las Vegas, Nevada, United States
|
|-
|Loss
|align=center|8–3
|Norma Dumont
|Decision (split)
|UFC Fight Night: Font vs. Garbrandt
|
|align=center|3
|align=center|5:00
|Las Vegas, Nevada, United States
|
|-
|Loss
|align=center|8–2
|Amanda Nunes
|Decision (unanimous)
|UFC 250
|
|align=center|5
|align=center|5:00
|Las Vegas, Nevada, United States
|
|-
|Win
|align=center|8–1
|Zarah Fairn Dos Santos
|TKO (punches and elbows)
|UFC Fight Night: Benavidez vs. Figueiredo 
|
|align=center|1
|align=center|3:37
|Norfolk, Virginia, United States
|
|-
|Loss
|align=center| 7–1
|Cris Cyborg
|Decision (unanimous)
|UFC 240 
|
|align=center|3
|align=center|5:00
|Edmonton, Alberta, Canada
|
|-
|Win
|align=center| 7–0
|Megan Anderson
|Submission (rear-naked choke)
|UFC Fight Night: dos Anjos vs. Lee 
|
|align=center|1
|align=center|3:24
|Rochester, New York, United States
|
|-
| Win
| align=center| 6–0
| Pam Sorenson
| Submission (rear-naked choke)
| Invicta FC 32: Spencer vs. Sorenson
| 
| align=center| 4
| align=center| 4:23
| Shawnee, Oklahoma, United States
|
|-
| Win
| align=center| 5–0
| Helena Kolesnyk
| Submission (rear-naked choke)
| Invicta FC 30: Frey vs. Grusander
| 
| align=center| 2
| align=center| 1:47
| Kansas City, Missouri, United States
| 
|-
| Win
| align=center| 4–0
| Akeela Al-Hameed
| Decision (unanimous)
| Invicta FC 27: Kaufman vs. Kianzad
| 
| align=center| 3
| align=center| 5:00
| Kansas City, Missouri, United States
| 
|-
| Win
| align=center| 3–0
| Amy Coleman
| Submission (rear-naked choke)
| Invicta FC 24: Dudieva vs. Borella
| 
| align=center| 1
| align=center| 3:17
| Kansas City, Missouri, United States
| 
|-
| Win
| align=center| 2–0
| Madison McElhaney
| Decision (unanimous)
| Invicta FC 22: Evinger vs. Kunitskaya II
| 
| align=center| 3
| align=center| 5:00
| Kansas City, Missouri, United States
|
|-
| Win
| align=center| 1–0
| Rachel Wiley
| TKO (elbows and punches)
| Invicta FC 14: Evinger vs. Kianzad
| 
| align=center| 1
| align=center| 3:32
| Kansas City, Missouri, United States
|
|-

See also
 List of female mixed martial artists
 List of Canadian UFC fighters

References

External links
 
 

1990 births
Living people
Canadian female mixed martial artists
Canadian female taekwondo practitioners
Canadian practitioners of Brazilian jiu-jitsu
People awarded a black belt in Brazilian jiu-jitsu
Female Brazilian jiu-jitsu practitioners
Lightweight mixed martial artists
Featherweight mixed martial artists
Mixed martial artists utilizing taekwondo
Mixed martial artists utilizing kickboxing
Mixed martial artists utilizing Brazilian jiu-jitsu
Ultimate Fighting Championship female fighters
University of Central Florida alumni
Sportspeople from Montreal
21st-century Canadian women